Lionel Meiring Spafford du Toit (26 January 1903 – 23 January 1979) was Dean of Carlisle from 1960 to 1973.

Rev du Toit was born in Urmston, Lancashire.  He was educated at Manchester Grammar School  and Merton College, Oxford and  ordained in 1928. 

He was a curate at Rochdale Parish Church until 1931 and then Swinton Parish Church until 1935. He was Rector  at Christ Church, Moss Side. until 1943 and Vicar of St Mary's, Windermere until his  elevation to the Deanery. He retired in 1973 and died on 23 January 1979.

References

1903 births
People educated at Manchester Grammar School
Alumni of Merton College, Oxford
Deans of Carlisle
1979 deaths